Cyrille Carré (born 11 May 1984 in Auxerre) is a French sprint and marathon canoeist who has competed since the late 2000s. He won a gold medal in the K-2 1000 m event at the 2007 ICF Canoe Sprint World Championships in Duisburg.

Carré also finished sixth in the K-2 1000 m event at the 2008 Summer Olympics in Beijing (with Philippe Colin).  At the 2012 Summer Olympics, he competed in the K-1 1000 m, finishing in 12th.

External links

1984 births
Living people
French male canoeists
Olympic canoeists of France
Canoeists at the 2008 Summer Olympics
Canoeists at the 2012 Summer Olympics
Canoeists at the 2016 Summer Olympics
European Games medalists in canoeing
European Games bronze medalists for France
Canoeists at the 2015 European Games
ICF Canoe Sprint World Championships medalists in kayak
Medalists at the ICF Canoe Marathon World Championships
Sportspeople from Auxerre
Mediterranean Games silver medalists for France
Mediterranean Games medalists in canoeing
Competitors at the 2005 Mediterranean Games
Canoeists at the 2019 European Games